Kurubavandla palli is a village in Penukonda(m), Anantapur district, Andhra Pradesh (state), India.

References

Villages in Anantapur district